Anopolis was a town and polis (city-state) of ancient Crete. Stephanus of Byzantium claims Anopolis an earlier name of, rather than a predecessor settlement to, Araden (Ἀραδήν)

Its site is located near modern Anopoli.

References

Populated places in ancient Crete
Former populated places in Greece
Cretan city-states